Henau is an Ortsgemeinde – a municipality belonging to a Verbandsgemeinde, a kind of collective municipality – in the Rhein-Hunsrück-Kreis (district) in Rhineland-Palatinate, Germany. It belongs to the Verbandsgemeinde of Kirchberg, whose seat is in the like-named town.

Geography

Location
The municipality lies on the western edge of the Soonwald, a heavily wooded section of the west-central Hunsrück, at an elevation of 400 m above sea level, above the Kellenbach.

History
Bearing witness to Henau's very early history are a stone hammer and a loom weight unearthed within the municipality's limits. These are now kept at the Hunsrückmuseum in Simmern.

In 1316, Henau had its first documentary mention in a document from Count Simon II of Sponheim. The Koppenstein Castle ruin, found within the municipality's limits, held town rights beginning in 1330, but had fallen into disrepair by the 16th century. Beginning in 1794, Henau lay under French rule. In 1815 it was assigned to the Kingdom of Prussia at the Congress of Vienna. Since 1946, it has been part of the then newly founded state of Rhineland-Palatinate.

Politics

Municipal council
The council is made up of 6 council members, who were elected at the municipal election held in 2019

Mayor
Henau's mayor is Reinhard Lanz, installed in November 2020.

Coat of arms
The German blazon reads: 

The municipality's arms might in English heraldic language be described thus: Per fess, vert a lion passant guardant argent armed and langued gules and chequy azure and Or an arming buckle of the second studded of the third.

The lion (Löwe) is perhaps somewhat confusingly also called a leopard in the German blazon. This confusion also arises in English heraldry, with “leopard” often being the word used in earlier times for a cat charge in this particular attitude, namely “passant” (that is, striding along). James Parker, though, holds that “lion” was the usual term for both in later times, and that practically the same creature was meant, anyway. Whichever the cat is meant to be, the charge is drawn from the arms once borne by the Knights of Steinkallenfels, who were as early as the 12th century the lords of the Kellenbach high court and held lands in Henau, which itself was part of the high court's territory. The cat also recalls the Knights of Kellenbach, who were among the Steinkallenfelses’ descendants, and in the 13th century, were also part-owners of the Kellenbach high court. The “chequy” pattern below the line of partition refers to the Counts of Sponheim. It was they who held Koppenstein Castle, now within Henau's municipal limits, and they also held a share of the Kellenbach court. The buckle stands for yet another knightly family, the Knights of Schmidtburg, who were likewise part-owners of the Kellenbach high court, and who later also came into ownership of Koppenstein Castle.

Culture and sightseeing

Buildings
The following are listed buildings or sites in Rhineland-Palatinate’s Directory of Cultural Monuments:
 Hauptstraße, on the village's outskirts – water cistern; hexagonal quarrystone building, battlements, marked 1924
 Soonwaldstraße 1 – timber-frame double house, sided, 19th century
 Koppenstein Castle ruin, northeast of Henau on a wooded mountain ridge – founding in 10th century (?); upper castle with five-sided keep, latter half of the 13th century; bailey, south, east and north sides girded by doubled ringwall, entrance in the south, beneath the keep remnants of the lodgings, rectangular building with corner turrets

Economy and infrastructure
The once dominant form of agriculture has all but disappeared, and one large company works almost all farmlands. Above the village is a big quartzite stripmine.

References

External links

 Henau in the collective municipality’s webpages 

Municipalities in Rhineland-Palatinate
Rhein-Hunsrück-Kreis